The 1961–62 Yorkshire Football League was the 36th season in the history of the Yorkshire Football League, a football competition in England. This season Division Three was formed. It was made of reserve sides of eight league clubs plus Leeds United 'A'.

Division One

Division One featured 12 clubs which competed in the previous season, along with four new clubs, promoted from Division Two:
Goole Town reserves
Hallam
Harrogate Town
Swillington Miners Welfare

League table

Map

Division Two

Division Two featured ten clubs which competed in the previous season, along with four new clubs.
Clubs relegated from Division One:
Doncaster United
Sheffield
Plus:
Brodsworth Main Colliery, joined from the Doncaster & District Senior League
Hull Brunswick

Also, Wombwell changed name to Wombwell Sporting Association.

League table

Map

References

1961–62 in English football leagues
Yorkshire Football League